Woodland High School is a public high school located in unincorporated Cowlitz County, Washington, with a Woodland postal address. It has approximately 700 students. It is a part of Woodland Public Schools.

In addition to Woodland its service area includes Cougar.

History 
In 2005 the district purchased a plot of land to build a new high school.  In 2007 the district received public comments recommending that it build a new high school building funded by a bond, with the expected amount of the bond being $50 million. In January 2008 voters were offered a vote on the bond but they rejected it, so the district at the time proposed leasing the land for farmers.

On August 31, 2015 Woodland High School moved from 757 Park Street to its newly constructed current location at 1500 Dike Access Road.

In 2020 Phillip Pearson became the principal.

Sports 
Woodland participates in the Southwest Washington 2A Greater St. Helens League and a member of the Washington Interscholastic Activities Association (WIAA).  School sponsored sports include; baseball, boys wrestling, cross country, football, basketball, golf, soccer, softball, track and volleyball.

State championships
 Boys Track: 1967, 1973
 Girls Golf: 2006
 Boys Golf: 2014
 Girls Track: 1982, 1991, 2004
 Softball: 2010, 2017, 2018
 Volleyball: 1996, 2003
 Football: 1972

State runners-up
 Boys Track: 1966, 1978
 Girls Track: 1963, 1998
 Football: 1982
 Girls Golf: 2005
 Volleyball: 1992, 2001, 2004
 Baseball: 2014

References

External links 
Woodland High School - Official school website

High schools in Cowlitz County, Washington
Public high schools in Washington (state)